Cerithiopsis melvilli is a species of sea snail, a gastropod in the family Cerithiopsidae. It was described by Jay and Drivas in 2002.

References

melvilli
Gastropods described in 2002